Au Ka-wang  (born 1967) is the current Director of Immigration of Hong Kong since July 2020. He began service in the Immigration Department in 1988.

Career 
He joined the Immigration Department in November 1988 as an Assistant Immigration Officer. In 1992, he was promoted to Immigration Officer. In 2003, he was promoted to Senior Immigration Officer. He was then promoted to Chief Immigration Officer in 2009, to Assistant Principal Immigration Officer in 2014 and to Principal Immigration Officer in 2015. He was elevated to Assistant Director of Immigration in 2018 and Deputy Director of Immigration in 2019. He has been the acting Director of Immigration since 23 April 2020 when Director Erick Tsang became Secretary for Constitutional and Mainland Affairs, until the State Council officially appointed him as Director on 2 July 2020.

In July 2021, it was revealed that Au was fined for breaking social-distancing rules by attending a banquet dinner at a luxury clubhouse.

On 5 January 2022, Carrie Lam announced new warnings and restrictions against social gathering due to potential COVID-19 outbreaks. One day later, it was discovered that Au attended a birthday party hosted by Witman Hung Wai-man, with 222 guests. At least one guest tested positive with COVID-19, causing all guests to be quarantined. Au failed to show authorities his check-in time at the venue with the "LeaveHomeSafe" app, mandatory for all visitors at restaurants. According to Lam, Au claimed to have "only stayed for a very short time, and did not enter the restaurant's core area".  He was ordered to take leave until 24 January.

Personal life 
In August 2022, Au tested positive for COVID-19.

References 

Living people
1967 births
Hong Kong civil servants